Hu Baosen is a Chinese businessman and the owner of Henan Jianye of the Chinese Super League. He is the founder, owner, and chairman of Henan Jianye, a construction firm. He has been listed by Forbes as one of China's 400 richest individuals. He is also the owner and chairman of Henan Jianye F.C.

References

Chinese businesspeople
Living people
Year of birth missing (living people)
Chinese football chairmen and investors